The Eight Legged Groove Machine is the debut album by the Wonder Stuff from August 1988.

Track listing 
All tracks composed by The Wonder Stuff
 "Red Berry Joy Town" 2:48
 "No, for the 13th Time" 3:02
 "It's Yer Money I'm After, Baby" 2:48
 "Rue the Day" 1:56
 "Give, Give, Give Me More, More, More" 2:49
 "Like a Merry Go Round" 2:40
 "The Animals and Me" 3:05
 "A Wish Away" 2:30
 "Grin" 2:58
 "Mother and I" 2:24
 "Some Sad Someone" 2:47
 "Ruby Horse" 3:06
 "Unbearable" 2:28
 "Poison" 2:58
 "Times Will Change"(CD bonus track) 0.41

2000 reissue bonus tracks 

 "A Song Without an End" 4.09
 "Goodbye Fatman" 3.11
 "Astley in the Noose"  3.30
 "Ooh, She Said" 2.52

20th Anniversary Edition
Re-recordings of the original album with bonus tracks, October 2008:
 "Red Berry Joy Town" 
 "No, for the 13th Time" 
 "It's Yer Money I'm After, Baby" 
 "Rue The Day" 
 "Give, Give, Give Me More, More, More" 
 "Like a Merry Go Round" 
 "The Animals and Me" 
 "A Wish Away" 
 "Grin" 
 "Mother and I" 
 "Some Sad Someone" 
 "Ruby Horse"
 "Unbearable" 
 "Poison" 
 "Who Wants to Be the Disco King?"
 "Astley in the Noose"
 "Goodbye Fatman"
 "Ooh, She Said"
 "Ten Trenches Deep"
 "A Song Without an End"
 "Times Will Change"
 "Apple of My Eye" - bonus track
 "Safety Pin Stuck in My Heart" - bonus track
 "Shit Out of Luck" - bonus track

Personnel 
1988 recording:
The Wonder Stuff
Miles Hunt - vocals, guitars
Malc Treece - vocals, guitars
Rob "The Bass Thing" Jones - bass
Martin Gilks - drums
Technical
Jessica Corcoran - engineer
Martyn Strickland - photography

References

External links 
 The Wonder Stuff discography

The Wonder Stuff albums
1988 debut albums
Polydor Records albums